Bert Stanley Scharfe (November 17, 1910 – November 26, 1994) was a Canadian ice hockey player.

Scharfe was a member of the Saskatoon Quakers who represented Canada at the 1934 World Ice Hockey Championships held in Milan, Italy where they won Gold.

See also
List of Canadian national ice hockey team rosters

References

External links

Canadian ice hockey centres
Saskatoon Quakers players
Ice hockey people from Saskatchewan
Sportspeople from Saskatoon
1910 births
1994 deaths